Andinosaura kiziriani is a species of lizard in the family Gymnophthalmidae. It is endemic to Ecuador.

References

Andinosaura
Reptiles of Ecuador
Endemic fauna of Ecuador
Reptiles described in 2012
Taxa named by Santiago J. Sánchez-Pacheco
Taxa named by Vanessa Aguirre-Peñafiel
Taxa named by Omar Torres-Carvajal